Antonio Labacco was a 16th-century architect, engraver, and writer about the architecture of classical Rome. His name is also given variously as Antonio Labacco, Antonio dall' Abacco, Antonio da Labacco, Antonio Abaco', Antonio l'Abco, or Antonio Abacco.

Life

Labacco was born near  Vigevano in about 1495. He was a pupil of Antonio da Sangallo the Younger in Rome.

In 1558 he published an  architectural treatise, entitled , with plates he had engraved himself. He also engraved the plans of the Basilica of St. Peter's from Sangallo's designs  He died some time after 1567.

References

Renaissance architects
Italian engravers
Italian antiquarians
16th-century Italian architects